Pencoed railway station is a minor station in Pencoed, Bridgend county borough, south Wales.

It is a stop on the South Wales Main Line, served by trains on the Maesteg Line, and occasionally by Swanline Cardiff to Swansea regional services, as well as the peak time Manchester to Carmarthen service. All trains are operated by Transport for Wales Rail.

History
The present station was one of two reopened between Cardiff and Bridgend by British Rail in September 1992 as part of the Maesteg Line reinstatement scheme, the previous station here having succumbed to the Beeching Axe in November 1964 (along with many other smaller stations on the Cardiff to Swansea main line).

Facilities
The station has 2 platforms:
Platform 1, for westbound trains towards Swansea
Platform 2, for eastbound trains towards Cardiff

The station is unmanned - there is no ticket office nor are there any platform entry barriers. Passengers must purchase tickets on board trains or from a self-service ticket machine near the station entrance on platform 2. The two platforms are offset from each other, with platform 2 (Cardiff-bound) to the east of the level crossing that bisects the site and platform 1 (West Wales) to the west of it. Each platform has a waiting shelter, CIS display and timetable posters, whilst there is also a customer help point at the entrance to platform 1. Though the station footbridge has steps, level access to both sides is possible via the road crossing.

Incidents
In June 2008, a 16-year-old girl Sophie Harris was struck by a train and killed. Harris had been drinking.

Services
These services are operated mainly by Class 170 Turbostar units.

On Sundays the service decreases slightly.

References

External links

Railway stations in Bridgend County Borough
DfT Category F2 stations
Former Great Western Railway stations
Railway stations in Great Britain opened in 1850
Railway stations in Great Britain closed in 1964
Railway stations in Great Britain opened in 1992
Reopened railway stations in Great Britain
South Wales Main Line
Railway stations served by Transport for Wales Rail
Beeching closures in Wales
Pencoed